George C. Smith was a superintendent of education and state legislator in Mississippi.

He was born in Ohio. He represented Coahoma County in the Mississippi Senate from 1874-1875. He was a Republican.

His account of political intimidation and violence at Friars Point was reported in a newspaper.

See also
African-American officeholders during and following the Reconstruction era

References

Year of birth missing
Republican Party Mississippi state senators